Marina Nikolayevna Oswald Porter ( Prusakova; ; born July 17, 1941) is the Russian-American widow of Lee Harvey Oswald, the assassin of US President John F. Kennedy.

Early life
Porter was born Marina Nikolayevna Prusakova in the city of Molotovsk (now Severodvinsk), in Arkhangelsk Oblast, in the northwest of the Soviet Union. She lived there with her mother and stepfather until 1957, when she moved to Minsk to live with her uncle Ilya Prusakov, a colonel in the Soviet Ministry of Internal Affairs, and to study pharmacy.

Life with Oswald
Marina met Lee Harvey Oswald (a former U.S. Marine who had defected to the Soviet Union) at a dance on March 17, 1961. They married six weeks later and had a daughter, June Lee, born the following year. In June 1962, the family emigrated to the United States and settled in Dallas, Texas. At a party in February 1963, George de Mohrenschildt introduced the couple to Ruth Paine, a Quaker and Russian language student.

The photographs in the backyard

In January 1963, Oswald mail-ordered a Smith & Wesson .38 revolver and then, in March, a Mannlicher–Carcano rifle. Later that month, as Marina told the Warren Commission, she took only one photograph of Oswald dressed in black and holding his weapons along with an issue of The Militant newspaper, which named ex-general Edwin Walker as a "fascist." 

Despite her sworn testimony that she took only one photo, the Warren Commission had two different poses of Lee Oswald, so they browbeat Marina into supposing that she might have accidentally taken the second pose.  However, since 1964, historians have counted four different photographs!

These photos became known as the "backyard photos" of Lee Oswald, which some conspiracy theorists dismiss as fake. Two photographs were later found in the garage of the Paine household.  A third one was in the possession of George de Mohrenschildt.  

The photo had been given to de Mohrenschildt was signed and dated by Lee Oswald on April 5, 1963 (five days before his General Walker shooting).  George eventually revealed this photograph to the HSCA (House Select Committee on Assassinations) in 1977, shortly before allegedly committing suicide.  It is similar to the photo published by LIFE magazine in early 1964, except that it has a much larger background.

The photo also has a quote in Russian, the translation of which reads "Hunter of Fascists, Ha-Ha-Ha!!!"  Although many suspect it should be attributed to Marina, she denied writing the inscription in her 1977 testimony to the HSCA.  Some ask whether the handwriting looks more like that of George's wife, Jeanne.
 
In 1990, a fourth Backyard Photograph was produced by Ricky White and his mother, Geneva White, showing Lee Oswald in a completely different pose -- with his hands raised above his head while holding his rifle and the newspapers.

The couple's background in Dallas

In April 1963, Marina and her daughter moved in with Ruth Paine (who had recently separated from her husband, Michael). Lee Oswald rented a separate room in Dallas and briefly moved to New Orleans during the summer of 1963. He returned to Dallas in early October, eventually renting a room in a boarding house in the Oak Cliff neighborhood of Dallas. 

Ruth Paine learned from a neighbor that employment was available at the Texas School Book Depository, and Oswald was hired and began working there on October 16, 1963, as an order filler. On October 18, Marina and Ruth Paine had planned a birthday party for Oswald. They put up some decorations and got a birthday cake and wine. Oswald was so moved by the gesture that he had tears in his eyes. He remained emotional throughout the evening, crying and apologising to Marina for all the things he had put her through. On October 20, Marina gave birth to a second daughter, Audrey Marina Rachel Oswald at Parkland Memorial Hospital. Her husband continued to live in Oak Cliff on weekdays, but stayed with her at the Paine household in Irving on weekends, an arrangement that continued until Oswald was arrested for the assassination of President Kennedy.

Assassination of John F. Kennedy
Marina learned of the assassination of John F. Kennedy from the media coverage of the event, and later, of the arrest of her husband. That afternoon, Dallas Police Department detectives arrived at the Paine household, and when asked if Lee owned a rifle, Marina gestured to the garage, where Oswald stored his rifle rolled up in a blanket; no rifle was found. She was subsequently questioned both at the Paine household and later at Dallas Police Department headquarters, in reference to her husband's involvement in the assassination of the President and the shooting of Dallas police officer J. D. Tippit. Marina testified that when she saw her husband, he was calm but “by his eyes I could tell that he was afraid. He said goodbye to me with his eyes. I knew that.”

She was widowed at age 22, two days after the assassination when Oswald was fatally shot by Jack Ruby as Oswald was being transferred from the City Jail to the County Jail. Marina asked to go to Parkland Hospital to see Oswald's body. She opened his eyelids and said, “He cry, he eye wet.“ After the assassination of Kennedy and the arrest of her husband, Marina was under Secret Service protection until she completed her testimony before the Warren Commission. She made a total of four appearances before the commission. Questions about her reliability as a witness were expressed within the commission, particularly in regard to her claims about an assassination attempt on General Edwin Walker, and her allegation that Lee Oswald had intended to assassinate Richard Nixon. In her testimony, she stated her belief that her husband was guilty, an opinion she reiterated in testimony before the House Select Committee on Assassinations in 1978.

Later life
She remained at first in Dallas, Texas. Donations sent to her by anonymous donors totaled about $70,000. She sold Lee's Russian diary for $20,000 and a picture of him holding the gun used to shoot Kennedy for $5,000. She also attempted, but failed, to gain possession of the gun in order to sell it.

In 1965 she enrolled at the University of Michigan, but she later returned to Dallas and bought a house.
In 1965 she married electronics worker Kenneth Jess Porter, with whom she had a son, and whom she later accused of domestic violence. In 1989, she became a naturalized United States citizen. 

Though she has not formally recanted any of her Warren Commission testimony, Marina has said that she now believes that Oswald was completely innocent of the murders of Kennedy and Tippit and that the "prayer man" seen on the steps of the Book Depository at the time of the assassination was Lee.

See also
 Marguerite Oswald

References

Bibliography
 .
 .

External links

1941 births
Soviet emigrants to the United States
American pharmacists
Living people
People associated with the assassination of John F. Kennedy
People from Rockwall, Texas
People from Severodvinsk
American people of Russian descent
John F. Kennedy conspiracy theorists
Naturalized citizens of the United States